"" (translated as "Dedication" or "Devotion") is a  composed by Richard Strauss in 1885 (completed 13 August), setting a poem by the Austrian poet Hermann von Gilm. It was included in Strauss's first published collection of songs,  as Op. 10 in 1885. Originally scored for voice and piano, the song was orchestrated in 1932 by the German conductor Robert Heger and in 1940 by Strauss himself. It is one of the composer's best-known songs.

History 

In 1882, his friend Ludwig Thuile introduced Strauss to the poetry of Gilm contained in the volume  (last leaves), published in the year of the poet's death (and the composer's birth) 1864. However, the original Gilm poem was not contained in this volume, and the original title of Gilm's poem was the refrain "" ("have thanks" or "take thanks"). The Opus 10 songs were all written for the tenor voice, which caused some trouble in the Strauss family, since his father Franz wanted him to write his first published songs for his Aunt Johanna as thanks for all of her help with his musical development. The song was dedicated to the principal tenor of the Munich Court Opera, Heinrich Vogl. Strauss promised to later write some songs for Aunt Johanna. "" was the first of eight songs by Strauss published as Op. 10, which were all settings of Gilm's poems. In 1885, they were the first songs Strauss ever published. The song was given its first public performance at Meiningen in a chamber concert on 5 March 1886 (along with three other Opus 10 songs "Nichts", "Allerseelen", and "Georgine") sung by the tenor .

In 1897, John Bernhoff wrote an English version of the lyrics, which were published as a bilingual “Universal Edition” by his publishers (Joseph Aible Verlag, Leipzig).

The song was orchestrated by the German conductor Robert Heger in 1932. In June 1940, Richard Strauss orchestrated the song for Viorica Ursuleac. Strauss altered the music slightly and also added an extra line "Du wunderbare Helena" (you wonderful Helena), referring to her singing of the title role in his opera Die ägyptische Helena at the Salzburg Festival in 1933. The Strauss orchestration was premiered at Rome on 4 July 1940 with Ursulaec singing and her husband Clemens Krauss conducting.

Strauss recorded the song three times with himself on the piano; in 1919 with the baritone Heinrich Schlusnus and twice in 1942 from Vienna for wartime radio broadcasts with soprano Maria Reining and tenor Anton Dermota.

Lyrics

Orchestral arrangements

The 1940 orchestration by Strauss was completed at Garmisch on 19 June 1940. The following instrumentation is employed.

 Two flutes, two oboes, two clarinets, three bassoons
 Four french horns, three trumpets
 Timpani
 Two harps
 Strings

The 1932 orchestration by Heger has the following instrumentation:

 Two flutes, two oboes, two clarinets, bass clarinet, two bassoons
 Four french horns, two trumpets, one trombone
 Timpani
 One harp
 Strings

Notes

References

Cited sources 
 Norman Del Mar, Richard Strauss. A Critical Commentary on his Life and Works, Volume 3, London: Faber and Faber (2009) [1968] (second edition), .

External links 
 
 Zueignung (in German) Theater Karlsruhe
 Paul Thomason: Zueignung and other songs
 Georg Hirsch: Radio Script in German / "Aus Lotte Lehmanns Archiv" lottelehmannleague.org
 Tara Diana Warfield: A voice teacher prepares: using art song as ateaching tool for the role of Sophie in Der Rosenkavalier DMA (Doctor of Musical Arts) thesis, University of Iowa, 2011
 Keith Anderson: Richard Strauss (1864–1949) / Songs of Love and Death Naxos

Songs by Richard Strauss
1883 songs